Daudi Kabaka (1939–2001) was a Kenyan vocalist and musician.

The type of music he is known for is called Benga, a popular style in East Africa. His best-known songs include "African Twist", "Harambee Harambee" and "Western Shilo".

His song "Helule Helule" was covered by The Tremeloes and it became a hit in United Kingdom.

Daudi Kabaka is also known for his Kenyan classic "Harambee Harambee" which largely reflects the aspirations of post-colonial Kenya to build their nation.
One of his famous songs; "Msichana wa Elimu" is still popularly played in the Kenyan media houses as it advises about marriage.
He collaborated with John Nzenze on three songs: "Masista", "Bachelor Boy" and "Nyumba za Tobacco". These songs were released by Jambo Records and became hits. Kabaka released the album Pesa Maradhi Ya Moyo with Maroon Commandos in 1986.

References

20th-century Kenyan male singers
1939 births
2001 deaths